G-Dragon is a South Korean rapper, singer-songwriter, record producer, and a member of South Korean boy band Big Bang formed by YG Entertainment in 2006. He has won numerous awards and recognitions for his work in both the music and fashion industry.

G-Dragon won Album of the Year at both the 2009 Mnet Asian Music Awards and Melon Music Awards for his debut studio album Heartbreaker. In 2013, he won Record of the Year at the Seoul Music Awards and Digital Bonsang at the Golden Disc Awards for his first extended play One of a Kind, and also Best Rap/Hip-hop Song at the Korean Music Awards for his single of the same name. At the 2013 Mnet Asian Music Awards, he was the most awarded and nominated act winning four out of six nominations including Artist of the Year, Best Male Artist, and Best Music Video.

G-Dragon won the Style Icon of the Year Award in 2013, and was also honored with the same award in 2016. In 2015, he was chosen by GQ Korea as their Man of the Year. In 2016, he was recognised by the Ministry of Culture, Sports and Tourism for his achievements in the entertainment industry and given the Korean Prime Minister Recognition Award. Forbes listed him as the Most Influential Person Under 30 in Asia's Entertainment and Sports in 2016.


Awards and nominations

Other awards

Listicles

See also
 List of awards and nominations received by Big Bang
 List of awards and nominations received by GD X Taeyang
 List of awards and nominations received by GD & TOP

Notes

References

G-Dragon
G-Dragon